Yntymak (before 2001: Калинин Kalinin) is a village in the Talas Region of north-west Kyrgyzstan. It is part of the Bakay-Ata District. Its population was 2,918 in 2021.

References

Populated places in Talas Region